The superior sagittal sinus (also known as the superior longitudinal sinus), within the human head, is an unpaired area along the attached margin of the falx cerebri. It allows blood to drain from the lateral aspects of anterior cerebral hemispheres to the confluence of sinuses. Cerebrospinal fluid drains through arachnoid granulations into the superior sagittal sinus and is returned to venous circulation.

Structure

Commencing at the foramen cecum, through which it receives emissary veins from the nasal cavity, it runs from anterior to posterior, grooving the inner surface of the frontal, the adjacent margins of the two parietal lobes, and the superior division of the cruciate eminence of the occipital lobe. Near the internal occipital protuberance, it drains into the confluence of sinuses and deviates to either side (usually the right). At this point it is continued as the corresponding transverse sinus. The superior sagittal sinus is usually divided into three parts: anterior (foramen cecum to bregma), middle (bregma to lambda), posterior (lambda to confluence).

It is triangular in section, narrow in front, and gradually increases in size as it passes backward.

Its inner surface presents the openings of the superior cerebral veins, which run, for the most part, obliquely forward, and open chiefly at the back part of the sinus, their orifices being concealed by fibrous folds; numerous fibrous bands (chordae Willisii) extend transversely across the inferior angle of the sinus; and, lastly, small openings communicate with irregularly shaped venous spaces (venous lacunae) in the dura mater near the sinus.

There are usually three lacunae on either side of the sinus: a small frontal, a large parietal, and an occipital, intermediate in size between the other two.

Most of the cerebral veins from the outer surface of the hemisphere open into these lacunæ, and numerous arachnoid granulations (Pacchionian bodies) project into them from below.

The superior sagittal sinus receives the superior cerebral veins, veins from the diploë and dura mater, and, near the posterior extremity of the sagittal suture, veins from the pericranium, which pass through the parietal foramina.

Function

Cerebrospinal fluid drains through arachnoid granulations into the superior sagittal sinus and is returned to venous circulation.

Additional images

See also
Superficial veins of the brain

References

External links
 http://neuroangio.org/venous-brain-anatomy/venous-sinuses/

Veins of the head and neck